The Lane River is an  stream in central New Hampshire in the United States. It is a tributary of the Warner River, part of the Contoocook River (and ultimately Merrimack River) watershed.

The Lane River begins at the outlet of Kezar Lake in the village of North Sutton. The river continues southeast through more wetlands and past the village of South Sutton, then becomes more rapid as it descends to the Warner River at the Sutton/Warner town line.

See also

List of rivers of New Hampshire

References

Tributaries of the Merrimack River
Rivers of New Hampshire
Rivers of Merrimack County, New Hampshire